An application program (software application, or application, or app for short) is a computer program designed to carry out a specific task other than one relating to the operation of the computer itself, typically to be used by end-users. Word processors, media players, and accounting software are examples. The collective noun "application software" refers to all applications collectively. The other principal classifications of software are system software, relating to the operation of the computer, and utility software ("utilities").

Applications may be bundled with the computer and its system software or published separately and may be coded as proprietary, open-source, or projects. The term "app" usually refers to applications for mobile devices such as phones.

Terminology 
In information technology, an application (app), an application program, or application software is a computer program designed to help people perform an activity. Depending on the activity for which it was designed, an application can manipulate text, numbers, audio, graphics, and a combination of these elements. Some application packages focus on a single task, such as word processing; others called integrated software include several applications.

User-written software tailors systems to meet the user's specific needs. User-written software includes spreadsheet templates, word processor macros, scientific simulations, audio, graphics, and animation scripts. Even email filters are a kind of user software. Users create this software themselves and often overlook how important it is.

The delineation between system software such as operating systems and application software is not exact, however, and is occasionally the object of controversy.  For example, one of the key questions in the United States v. Microsoft Corp. antitrust trial was whether Microsoft's Internet Explorer web browser was part of its Windows operating system or a separable piece of application software.  As another example, the GNU/Linux naming controversy is, in part, due to disagreement about the relationship between the Linux kernel and the operating systems built over this kernel. In some types of embedded systems, the application software and the operating system software may be indistinguishable from the user, as in the case of software used to control a VCR, DVD player, or microwave oven. The above definitions may exclude some applications that may exist on some computers in large organizations. For an alternative definition of an app:  see Application Portfolio Management.

Metonymy
The word "application" used as an adjective is not restricted to the "of or pertaining to application software" meaning. For example, concepts such as application programming interface (API), application server, application virtualization, application lifecycle management and portable application apply to all computer programs alike, not just application software.

Apps and killer apps

Some applications are available in versions for several different platforms; others only work on one and are thus called, for example, a geography application for Microsoft Windows, or an Android application for education, or a Linux game.  Sometimes a new and popular application arises that only runs on one platform, increasing the desirability of that platform.  This is called a killer application or killer app. For example, VisiCalc was the first modern spreadsheet software for the Apple II and helped sell the then-new personal computers into offices. For Blackberry it was their email software.

In recent years, the shortened term "app" (coined in 1981 or earlier) has become popular to refer to applications for mobile devices such as smartphones and tablets, the shortened form matching their typically smaller scope compared to applications on PCs. Even more recently, the shortened version is used for desktop application software as well.

Classification 
There are many different and alternative ways to classify application software.

From the legal point of view, application software is mainly classified with a black-box approach, about the rights of its end-users or subscribers (with eventual intermediate and tiered subscription levels).

Software applications are also classified in respect of the programming language in which the source code is written or executed, and concerning their purpose and outputs.

By property and use rights 
Application software is usually distinguished into two main classes: closed source vs open source software applications, and free or proprietary software applications.

Proprietary software is placed under the exclusive copyright, and a software license grants limited usage rights. The open-closed principle states that software may be "open only for extension, but not for modification". Such applications can only get add-on by third parties.

Free and open-source software shall be run, distributed, sold, or extended for any purpose, and -being open- shall be modified or reversed in the same way.

FOSS software applications released under a free license may be perpetual and also royalty-free. Perhaps, the owner, the holder or third-party enforcer of any right (copyright, trademark, patent, or ius in re aliena) are entitled to add exceptions, limitations, time decays or expiring dates to the license terms of use.

Public-domain software is a type of FOSS, which is royalty-free and - openly or reservedly- can be run, distributed, modified, reversed, republished, or created in derivative works without any copyright attribution and therefore revocation. It can even be sold, but without transferring the public domain property to other single subjects. Public-domain SW can be released under a (un)licensing legal statement, which enforces those terms and conditions for an indefinite duration (for a lifetime, or forever).

By coding language 
Since the development and near-universal adoption of the web, an important distinction that has emerged, has been between web applications — written with HTML, JavaScript and other web-native technologies and typically requiring one to be online and running a web browser — and the more traditional native applications written in whatever languages are available for one's particular type of computer. There has been a contentious debate in the computing community regarding web applications replacing native applications for many purposes, especially on mobile devices such as smartphones and tablets. Web apps have indeed greatly increased in popularity for some uses, but the advantages of applications make them unlikely to disappear soon, if ever. Furthermore, the two can be complementary, and even integrated.

By purpose and output 
Application software can also be seen as being either horizontal or vertical.  Horizontal applications are more popular and widespread, because they are general purpose, for example word processors or databases. Vertical applications are niche products, designed for a particular type of industry or business, or department within an organization. Integrated suites of software will try to handle every specific aspect possible of, for example, manufacturing or banking worker, accounting, or customer service.

There are many types of application software:

 An application suite consists of multiple applications bundled together. They usually have related functions, features, and user interfaces, and may be able to interact with each other, e.g. open each other's files. Business applications often come in suites, e.g. Microsoft Office, LibreOffice and iWork, which bundle together a word processor, a spreadsheet, etc.; but suites exist for other purposes, e.g. graphics or music.
 Enterprise software addresses the needs of an entire organization's processes and data flows, across several departments, often in a large distributed environment.  Examples include enterprise resource planning systems, customer relationship management (CRM) systems, data replication engines, and supply chain management software. Departmental Software is a sub-type of enterprise software with a focus on smaller organizations or groups within a large organization. (Examples include travel expense management and IT Helpdesk.)
 Enterprise infrastructure software provides common capabilities needed to support enterprise software systems.  (Examples include databases, email servers, and systems for managing networks and security.)
Application platform as a service (aPaaS) is a cloud computing service that offers development and deployment environments for application services.
 Information worker software lets users create and manage information, often for individual projects within a department, in contrast to enterprise management. Examples include time management, resource management, analytical, collaborative and documentation tools. Word processors, spreadsheets, email and blog clients, personal information systems, and individual media editors may aid in multiple information worker tasks.
 Content access software is used primarily to access content without editing, but may include software that allows for content editing. Such software addresses the needs of individuals and groups to consume digital entertainment and published digital content. (Examples include media players, web browsers, and help browsers.)
 Educational software is related to content access software, but has the content or features adapted for use by educators or students. For example, it may deliver evaluations (tests), track progress through material, or include collaborative capabilities.
 Simulation software simulates physical or abstract systems for either research, training, or entertainment purposes.
 Media development software generates print and electronic media for others to consume, most often in a commercial or educational setting. This includes graphic-art software, desktop publishing software, multimedia development software, HTML editors, digital-animation editors, digital audio and video composition, and many others.
 Product engineering software is used in developing hardware and software products. This includes computer-aided design (CAD), computer-aided engineering (CAE), computer language editing and compiling tools, integrated development environments, and application programmer interfaces.
 Entertainment Software can refer to video games, screen savers, programs to display motion pictures or play recorded music, and other forms of entertainment which can be experienced through the use of a computing device.

By platform 
Applications can also be classified by computing platforms such as a desktop application for a particular operating system, delivery network such as in cloud computing and Web 2.0 applications, or delivery devices such as mobile apps for mobile devices.

The operating system itself can be considered application software when performing simple calculating, measuring, rendering, and word processing tasks not used to control hardware via a command-line interface or graphical user interface. This does not include application software bundled within operating systems such as a software calculator or text editor.

Information worker software 
 Accounting software
 Data management
 Contact manager
 Spreadsheet
 Database software
 Documentation
 Document automation
 Word processor
 Desktop publishing software
 Diagramming software
 Presentation software
 Email
 Blog software
 Enterprise resource planning
 Financial software
 Banking software
 Clearing systems
 Financial accounting software
 Financial software
 Field service management
Workforce management software
 Project management software
 Calendaring software
 Employee scheduling software
 Workflow software
 Reservation systems

Entertainment software 
 Screen savers
 Video games
 Arcade games
 Console games
 Mobile games
 Personal computer games
 Software art
 Demo
 64K intro

Educational software 

 Classroom management
 Reference software
 Sales readiness software
 Survey management
 Encyclopedia software

Enterprise infrastructure software 
 Artificial Intelligence for IT Operations (AIOps)
 Business workflow software
 Database management system (DBMS)
 Digital asset management (DAM) software
 Document management software
 Geographic information system (GIS)

Simulation software 
 Computer simulators
 Scientific simulators
 Social simulators
 Battlefield simulators
 Emergency simulators
 Vehicle simulators
 Flight simulators
 Driving simulators
 Simulation games
 Vehicle simulation games

Media development software 
 3D computer graphics software
 Animation software
 Graphic art software
 Raster graphics editor
 Vector graphics editor
 Image organizer
 Video editing software
 Audio editing software
 Digital audio workstation
 Music sequencer
 Scorewriter
 HTML editor
 Game development tool

Product engineering software 
 Hardware engineering
 Computer-aided engineering
 Computer-aided design (CAD)
 Computer-aided manufacturing (CAM)
 Finite element analysis

Software engineering
 Compiler software
 Integrated development environment
 Compiler
 Linker
 Debugger
 Version control
 Game development tool
 License manager

See also 
 Software development
 Mobile app
 Web application

References

External links